Jacques de Lajoue, a French architectural painter, was born in 1687 in Paris. He became a member of the Academy in 1721, and is noticed for a 'Perspective' which he executed in 1732 at the Library of St. Geneviève. He also designed the title-page to the works of Wouwerman. Etchings have been made after him by Cochin, Tardieu, and others. He died in Paris in 1761.

References

Further reading 
Primary study
 
Reference books
 
 
 
 
 

1687 births
1761 deaths
18th-century French painters
French male painters
18th-century French male artists